Nicole Dmitrievna Kozlova (born 8 July 2000) is a footballer who plays as a forward for HB Køge. Born in Canada, she represents the Ukraine women's national team.

Early life
Kozlova was born in Toronto, Ontario to Ukrainian parents. She began playing football at age five with USC Academy.

In 2014 and 2015, she was part of the Ontario REX program, and also played with Toronto Skillz FC in 2015. In 2015 and 2016, she won back-to-back Ontario Cups with Scarborough GS United, also earning back-to-back bronze medals at the national championships. She represented Team Ontario at the 2017 Canada Games.

College career
In 2018, she began attending Virginia Tech, where she played for the women's soccer team. She redshirted her first year, after tearing her ACL, forcing her to miss the entire season. In September 2019, she earned ACC Offensive Player of the Week honours, after scoring back-to-back game winning goals. In 2021, she earned All-ACC Academic Team honours.

Club career
In 2016, she appeared in one match for Aurora United FC in League1 Ontario. In 2017, Kozlova played for the Woodbridge Strikers in League1 Ontario, where she scored 11 goals and was named a league First-Team All Star. In 2018 and 2019, she played for DeRo United FC in League1 Ontario.

In 2022, she joined HB Køge in Denmark.

International career
In 2016, she made her debut with the Ukraine U17.

In March 2017, she attended a camp with the Canada U20 team.

In May 2017, she scored four goals and added five assists in three matches with Ukraine at the UEFA U18 Development Tournament.

In June 2019, she earned her first callup to the Ukraine national team. She made her debut on October 5, 2019 against Germany. In 2022, they won the 2022 Turkish Women's Cup. She scored her first senior goal on 7 March 2020 at the 2020 Pinatar Cup against Northern Ireland.

International goals

References

External links

2000 births
Living people
People with acquired Ukrainian citizenship
Ukrainian women's footballers
Women's association football forwards
Virginia Tech Hokies women's soccer players
Ukraine women's international footballers
Ukrainian expatriate women's footballers
Ukrainian expatriate sportspeople in the United States
Expatriate women's soccer players in the United States
Soccer players from Toronto
Canadian women's soccer players
League1 Ontario (women) players
Canadian expatriate women's soccer players
Canadian expatriate sportspeople in the United States
Canadian people of Ukrainian descent
HB Køge (women) players
Aurora FC (Canada) players
DeRo United FC players
Canadian expatriate sportspeople in Denmark
Ukrainian expatriate sportspeople in Denmark
Expatriate women's footballers in Denmark